{{DISPLAYTITLE:Eta1 Doradus}}

Eta1 Doradus, Latinized from η1 Doradus, is a star in the southern constellation of Dorado. It is visible to the naked eye as a dim, white-hued star with an apparent visual magnitude of 5.72. This object is located approximately 335 light years distant from the Sun, based on parallax, and is drifting further away with a radial velocity of +18 km/s. It is circumpolar south of latitude 24°S.

This object is an A-type main-sequence star with a stellar classification of A0V. It is 94 million years old with a high rotation rate, showing a projected rotational velocity of 149. The star has 2.46 times the mass of the Sun and is radiating 49 times the Sun's luminosity from its photosphere at an effective temperature of 10,325 K.

References

External links
 2004. Starry Night Pro, Version 5.8.4. Imaginova. . www.starrynight.com

Dorado (constellation)
A-type main-sequence stars
042525
Doradus, Eta1
028909
PD-66 00493
2194
Southern pole stars